Victor Lee Brown (31 July 1914 – 26 March 1996) was the tenth Presiding Bishop of the Church of Jesus Christ of Latter-day Saints (LDS Church) from 1972 to 1985. He was an LDS Church general authority from 1961 until his death.

Brown was born in Cardston, Alberta, Canada, the son of Gerald Stephen Brown and Maggie Calder Lee.  Brown received his education from the University of Utah, LDS Business College and the University of California, Berkeley.  He worked in various ground operations management positions for several different airlines before becoming a full-time leader in the LDS Church.

Among other positions in the LDS Church, Brown served as bishop of the Denver 4th Ward. He and his wife, Lois Kjar, were the parents of five children.  One of their children, Victor L. Brown Jr., served as a stake president and an area director for the church's Welfare Services .

In 1961, Brown was called as second counselor to John H. Vandenburg in the presiding bishopric. In 1972, he succeeded Vandenburg.

In 1985, Brown was released as Presiding Bishop and called as a member of the First Quorum of the Seventy and as president of the Salt Lake Temple. He was designated an emeritus general authority in 1989. Brown died at Salt Lake City, Utah.

See also
 Council on the Disposition of the Tithes

References

“Elder Victor L. Brown Dies at 81,” Ensign, May 1996, p. 105
Leon R. Hartshorn. Outstanding Stories by General Authorities. (Salt Lake City: Deseret Book Company, 1970) Vol. 1, p. 23.

External resources
Grampa Bill's G.A. Pages: Victor L. Brown

1914 births
1996 deaths
Canadian general authorities (LDS Church)
Bishops in Colorado
Canadian Latter Day Saints
Latter Day Saints from Colorado
Latter Day Saints from Utah
Counselors in the Presiding Bishopric (LDS Church)
University of Utah alumni
Ensign College alumni
University of California, Berkeley alumni
Members of the First Quorum of the Seventy (LDS Church)
Temple presidents and matrons (LDS Church)
Presiding Bishops (LDS Church)
People from Cardston
Religious leaders from Colorado